McPixel is an independently produced puzzle video game by Polish developer Mikołaj Kamiński (also known as Sos Sosowski) in 2012.

Gameplay
The game centers around the title character, McPixel, who is a parody of both MacGyver and his other parody, MacGruber. The game features numerous references to popular culture characters.

McPixel's objective in the game is to defuse bombs or "save the day" in 20 seconds each level. There are four chapters in the game, each with three levels and an unlockable level. Each level contains six sequences. Most of the time McPixel defuses bombs in absurd ways, mainly by kicking almost everything in the level.

Release and reception

The game was released on 25 June 2012 for Android and iPhone and as a computer game.

McPixel received positive reviews, with a critic score of 76/100 on Metacritic for the PC version, and 83/100 critic score for the iOS version. The Verge gave the game a score of 8 out of 10, stating "McPixel is the step further, a parody of a parody. But it's stranger, grosser, funnier and far more blasphemous."

The game's creator and developer, Mikolaj "Sos" Kamiński, said: "The largest force driving attention to McPixel at that time were 'Let's Play' videos. Mostly by Jesse Cox and PewDiePie." Sos promoted the distribution of his game on The Pirate Bay to market it. He found out that McPixel was being torrented from a Reddit post. Due to this event, McPixel became the first game ever to be endorsed by the Pirate Bay.

As of September 2012, McPixel had sold 3,056 copies. The game was also the first game to be released via Steam Greenlight.

During August 15–22, 2013, McPixel featured alongside four other games in the Humble Bundle Weekly Sale ("Hosted by PewDiePie"), which sold 189,927 units.

As of October 2013, a Linux version exists, but is not yet available on Steam. Kamiński has stated on the Steam Forums that this is because the Adobe Air run-time can not be distributed via Steam. To fix this and other issues, Kamiński has stated that he intended to rewrite the game engine to not use Adobe Air. Kamiński announced the rewrite in June 2013, writing that he hoped to be done by September 2013, though there had been no news as of September 2014. As of June 2019, the Linux version is not on Steam, however Proton can be used to run the game.

Sequel
A sequel titled McPixel 3 was announced on 17 February 2022 and released on 14 November 2022.

References

External links
McPixel official website

2012 video games
Android (operating system) games
Indie video games
IOS games
Linux games
MacOS games
Parody video games
Point-and-click adventure games
Retro-style video games
Steam Greenlight games
Video games about bomb disposal
Video games developed in Poland
Windows games